This article is about Olympiacos F.C. honours. Historically, Olympiacos is the most successful football club in Greece with seventy-nine major domestic trophies, since no Greek football club has won any official major international title. Actually, they have won a record forty seven League titles, more than half of the total titles, a record twenty-eight Greek Cups and a record four Greek Super Cups.
Olympiacos has won more championships (47) than all the others Greek teams combined (39).

National titles (79) (record)

Greek Championships (47) (record)
Super League Greece (1960–present, including Alpha Ethniki 1960–2006)
Winners (32) (record): 1966, 1967, 1973, 1974, 1975, 1980, 1981, 1982, 1983, 1987, 1997, 1998, 1999, 2000, 2001, 2002, 2003, 2005, 2006, 2007, 2008, 2009, 2011, 2012, 2013,  2014, 2015, 2016, 2017, 2020, 2021, 2022
Runners-up (16): 1961, 1962, 1964, 1968, 1969, 1972, 1977, 1979, 1984, 1989, 1991, 1992, 1995, 2004, 2010, 2019

Panhellenic championship (1928–1959)
Winners (15) (record): 1931, 1933, 1934, 1936, 1937, 1938, 1947, 1948, 1951, 1954, 1955, 1956, 1957, 1958, 1959
Runners-up (2): 1949, 1953

National Cups (32) (record)
Greek Cup

Winners (28) (record): 1947, 1951, 1952, 1953, 1954, 1957, 1958, 1959, 1960, 1961, 1963, 1965, 1968, 1971, 1973, 1975, 1981, 1990, 1992, 1999, 2005, 2006, 2008, 2009, 2012, 2013, 2015, 2020
Runners-up (14): 1956, 1962, 1966, 1969, 1974, 1976, 1986, 1988, 1993, 2001, 2002, 2004, 2016, 2021

Greek Super Cup
Winners (4): 1980, 1987, 1992, 2007

Greek League Cup
Runners-up (1): 1990

International titles
Balkans Cup
Winners (1): 1963

Regional titles
Greater Greece Cup
Winners (3) (record): 1969, 1972, 1976

Piraeus Regional Championship
Winners (25) (record): 1925, 1926, 1927, 1929 (along with Ethnikos Piraeus F.C.), 1930, 1931, 1934, 1935, 1937, 1938, 1940, 1946, 1947, 1948, 1949, 1950, 1951, 1952, 1953, 1954, 1955, 1956, 1957, 1958, 1959
Runners-up (1): 1939

Southern Greece championship
Winners (2): 1933, 1934,
Runners-up (2): 1939, 1940

Unofficial titles
International Easter Cup
Winners (11) (record): 1928, 1929, 1936, 1943, 1945, 1946, 1949, 1951, 1953, 1959, 1964

International Christmas Cup
Winners (11) (record): 1943, 1948, 1951, 1952, 1953, 1954, 1956, 1959, 1960, 1961, 1962

References

External links
Rec.Sport.Soccer Statistics Foundation

Honours